Saturday Night Live is an American sketch comedy series created and produced by Lorne Michaels for most of the show's run. The show has aired on NBC since 1975.

After a disastrous 1994–95 season featuring a mix of old and new characters, Michaels decided to once again revamp the cast, keeping only five cast members and hiring six. The 1995–96 season once again saved the show from cancellation, introducing a new era of Saturday Night Live characters and sketches that were highly popular with audiences.

This cast stayed mostly stable until the 1998–99 season, which added cast members such as Jimmy Fallon and Horatio Sanz. These two would pave the way for the next era of Saturday Night Live in the early 2000s.

Rebuilding effort (1995–1996)

The 1995–96 season almost completely rebuilt the cast with new members Jim Breuer, Will Ferrell, Darrell Hammond, David Koechner, Cheri Oteri, Nancy Walls, Chris Kattan, Colin Quinn, and Fred Wolf. The only holdovers from the previous season were Norm Macdonald, Mark McKinney, Tim Meadows, Molly Shannon and David Spade. The larger-than-usual number of new hires was part of a rebuilding effort from the 1994–95 season, a season that executive producer Lorne Michaels acknowledged was "incredibly difficult". Lenny Pickett also took over for G.E. Smith as leader of the Saturday Night Live Band.

Of the cast members held over from the previous season, only Meadows and Spade were actual veterans. The other three were still newcomers to the show. Macdonald had a few bit parts in his first year (the 1993–94 season) and was the anchor of "Weekend Update" (a satirical news sketch performed during every episode) during the 1994–95 season, his performance considered a high point in a season widely considered lackluster. Shannon appeared in early 1995 as a featured performer after Janeane Garofalo quit the show; McKinney began in early 1995 as well, but as a contract player, having gained much experience in televised sketch comedy as a veteran of Canadian variety show The Kids in the Hall, also produced by Lorne Michaels. David Spade became the longest-serving cast member during this season. Fred Wolf, a writer for the show since 1991, would also serve a brief run as a featured player during this season and the next.

The new cast members quickly made an impression and revitalised the show. Hammond in particular quickly built up a repertoire of popular impersonations, including Bill Clinton and Chris Matthews.

Cast
Jim Breuer
Will Ferrell
Darrell Hammond
David Koechner
Norm Macdonald*
Mark McKinney
Tim Meadows
Cheri Oteri
Molly Shannon
David Spade
Nancy Walls

Featuring
Chris Kattan (first episode: March 16, 1996)
Colin Quinn (first episode credited: March 16, 1996)
Fred Wolf (first episode: April 13, 1996)

* denotes "Weekend Update" anchor

Cast stabilisation (1996–1997)

The ensemble from the 1995–96 season was mostly unchanged for the 1996–97 season, save for the firing of David Koechner and Nancy Walls, as well as the departure of David Spade. Tim Meadows became the longest-running cast member this season. Tracy Morgan and Ana Gasteyer both joined the cast, taking the places of Koechner and Walls. Mark McKinney left at the end of this season.

Cast
Jim Breuer
Will Ferrell
Ana Gasteyer
Darrell Hammond
Chris Kattan
Norm Macdonald*
Mark McKinney
Tim Meadows
Tracy Morgan
Cheri Oteri
Molly Shannon

Featuring
Colin Quinn
Fred Wolf (final episode: October 19, 1996)

* denotes "Weekend Update" anchor

The ensemble from the 1996–97 season remained substantially unchanged for the 1997–98 season. Jim Breuer would leave the show after this season, later blaming then-head writer Adam McKay, although McKay denies the allegations. This is also the only season of the show in which the intro is not based on New York City (instead, just showing colored bars and black-and-white pictures of the cast, musical guests, hosts, special guests, and announcement for Robert Smigel's "TV Funhouse" animated sketches).

Norm Macdonald's firing
While the cast was, for the most part, unchanged from the previous season, Norm Macdonald's surprise firing was the source of much speculation and scrutiny from the media. Macdonald frequently targeted O. J. Simpson and his murder trial on "Weekend Update", a recurring joke that then-NBC executive Don Ohlmeyer apparently disliked. This is rumoured to be the cause of Macdonald's firing, although Ohlmeyer denied the allegations. He was replaced on Weekend Update by castmate Colin Quinn starting January 10, 1998.

Cast
Jim Breuer
Will Ferrell
Ana Gasteyer
Darrell Hammond
Chris Kattan
Norm Macdonald* (final episode: March 14, 1998)
Tim Meadows
Tracy Morgan
Cheri Oteri
Colin Quinn*
Molly Shannon

* denotes "Weekend Update" anchor

New featured players (1998–1999)

The 1998–99 season introduced new cast members Jimmy Fallon, Chris Parnell and Horatio Sanz.

Cast
Will Ferrell
Ana Gasteyer
Darrell Hammond
Chris Kattan
Tim Meadows
Tracy Morgan
Cheri Oteri
Colin Quinn*
Molly Shannon

Featuring
Jimmy Fallon
Chris Parnell
Horatio Sanz

* denotes "Weekend Update" anchor

Cast shake-up (1999–2000)

The 1999–2000 season would be the last for Colin Quinn, Cheri Oteri, and long-time cast member Tim Meadows. Meadows (who was a cast member for 10 seasons) held the record as the longest-tenured cast member, a record surpassed from Kevin Nealon (who stayed on for nine seasons), however, castmate Darrell Hammond later surpassed him as the longest-tenured cast member during his 10th season. Meadows was also the longest-serving African-American cast member and would remain so for the next 13 years before he would eventually be surpassed by Kenan Thompson in the 2012–13 season. Then-featured players Rachel Dratch and Maya Rudolph (daughter of the late singer Minnie Riperton) were also introduced during this season.

Cast
Jimmy Fallon
Will Ferrell
Ana Gasteyer
Darrell Hammond
Chris Kattan
Tim Meadows
Tracy Morgan
Cheri Oteri
Chris Parnell
Colin Quinn*
Horatio Sanz
Molly Shannon

Featuring
Rachel Dratch (first episode: October 23, 1999)
Maya Rudolph (first episode: May 6, 2000)

* denotes "Weekend Update" anchor

References

1995
Saturday Night Live history 1995
Saturday Night Live 1995-2000
Saturday Night Live 1995-2000